The 1993 New Jersey State Senate elections were held on November 2.

The election took place alongside Christine Todd Whitman's election as Governor over incumbent Jim Florio. Republicans defended the large majority they gained in the 1991 landslide elections, though Democrats did win back two of the seats they lost in that election, and picked up a third seat in an upset over incumbent John H. Dorsey.

This election featured in the political rises of future Governors Jim McGreevey, who flipped one of the three Democratic gains by defeating Randy Corman, and Chris Christie, who unsuccessfully challenged Senator Dorsey in the Republican primary, possibly undermining Dorsey's re-election campaign.

Incumbents not running for re-election

Democratic 
 Matthew Feldman (District 37)

Republican 
 John E. Dimon (District 30)

Summary of results by State Senate district

District 1

District 2

District 3

District 4

District 5

District 6

District 7

District 8

District 9

District 10

District 11

District 12

District 13

District 14

District 15

District 16

District 17

District 18

District 19

District 20

District 21

District 22

District 23

District 24

District 25

Republican primary
Dorsey initially faced a primary challenge from Chris Christie, but Christie was disqualified when Dorsey challenged his nominating petition signatures as invalid, leaving Dorsey unopposed in the Republican primary.

Democratic primary
Lou Calesso was nominated in the initial Democratic primary, but withdrew thereafter in favor of former Senator Gordon MacInnes.

General election

District 26

District 27

District 28

District 29

District 30

District 31

District 32

District 33

District 34

District 35

District 36

District 37

District 38

District 39

District 40

References 

New Jersey State Senate elections
New Jersey State Senate
1993 New Jersey elections